Tetbury is a town and civil parish inside the Cotswold district in Gloucestershire, England. It lies on the site of an ancient hill fort, on which an Anglo-Saxon monastery was founded, probably by Ine of Wessex, in 681. The population of the parish was 5,250 in the 2001 census, increasing to 5,472 at the 2011 census. The population was 6,453 in the 2021 Census.

History
During the Middle Ages, Tetbury became an important market for Cotswold wool and yarn. Notable buildings in the town include the Church House and the late 18th century Gothic revival parish church of St Mary the Virgin and St Mary Magdalene and much of the rest of the town centre, dates from the 16th and 17th centuries. The Market House, dating from 1655 with restorations done in 1817, is a fine example of a Cotswold pillared market house that used to trade wool and yarn which was the main source of the town's wealth, it is still in use as a meeting place and market. Other attractions include the Tetbury Police Museum and Courtroom, Chavenage House, Highgrove House and Westonbirt Arboretum lie just outside the town.

The Tetbury Woolsack Races, founded 1972, is an annual competition where participants must carry a  sack of wool up and down a steep hill (Gumstool Hill). The Tetbury Woolsack Races take place on the "late May Bank Holiday", the last Monday in May each year.

Tetbury has won five consecutive Gold awards in the Regional "Heart of England in Bloom" competition in 2006, 2007, 2008, 2009 and 2010 and was category winner "Best Small Town" in 2008, 2009 and 2010. In 2010 Tetbury was Overall Winner of Heart of England in Bloom and won a Judges Discretionary Award for Community Achievement. Tetbury won Silver Gilt as a first-time entrant in the National Britain in Bloom Campaign in 2009 and a second Silver Gilt in Britain in Bloom in 2011.

Geography

Tetbury is situated in a landscape of gently rolling hills primarily used for farmland, including grazing of sheep and grain production. Its location is associated with a nearby major east–west trade or drovers trail, which would account for its early importance as a wool trade centre. Nearby to the west are Owlpen Manor, Beverston Castle and Calcot Manor. The Tetbury Avon, a tributary of the Bristol Avon, known locally as the Ingleburn rises to the north of the town.

Governance
Most of Tetbury falls in the Tetbury parish, although some of the northern parts of the town are officially in Tetbury Upton.

Tetbury is in the Cotswold district, and amenities are run by Cotswold District Council. Gloucestershire County Council is also responsible for parts of the town.

Nationally, Tetbury is in the Cotswold constituency, and has been represented in Parliament by Geoffrey Clifton-Brown (Conservative) since 1997. He has a majority of 20,000 over the Liberal Democrats.

Economy

Tetbury is renowned for its antique and bric-à-brac shops; Homes & Antiques magazine named Long Street one of the UK's top 10 favourite streets for shopping in December 2018. The town centre also has a number of independent specialist food and clothing shops, banks, charity shops, estate agents and other shops including lifestyle clothing brand Overider and the Prince of Wales's original "Highgrove Shop" which opened in 2008.

A Tesco supermarket branch was opened a quarter of a mile from the town centre in July 2002. The town's high street is the home to a number of specialist shops selling cheese, breads, meats, dairy and frozen products, entertainment supplies, among others.

The town has pubs and hotels, including the Royal Oak Inn which was featured in the 1971 film Dulcima and in an episode of BBC One's Bonekickers. The Trouble House, immediately outside the town, was served by Trouble House Halt between 1959 and 1964.

Culture
Events in the town include Woolsack Day, held on the last Bank Holiday in May, famous for the races and street fair. A flower show is held at the recreation ground. The first "Tetbury Fiesta" was held on the recreation ground in July 2008. Tetbury Music Festival is held in early October.

Hospital
Tetbury Hospital is a privately run facility which funds itself from government funding and charitable donations. The hospital, which homes a Minor Injuries Unit, was rated as "needing improvement" by the Care Quality Commission in 2016. In 2005 it was announced that beds at the site would be cut. The nearest Accident and Emergency Department is in Cirencester.

Education
The town has two schools, St Mary's Primary School and Sir William Romney's School, a secondary school which specialises in creative arts. In 2006 Sir William Romney's announced that it would be closing its Sixth Form centre, meaning students wishing to sit A-Levels now travel to Cirencester, Stroud or Filton College in Bristol. Westonbirt School is an independent school for girls aged 11 to 18.

Some Tetbury children travel further afield, with students at the two grammar schools, Marling School for boys and Stroud High School for girls, both in Stroud, and some at the comprehensive Deer Park School in Cirencester.

Transport

Tetbury has bus services which serve local towns. Tetbury railway station closed in 1964, and the nearest railway station is now at Kemble; the nearest major airport is Bristol Airport. General aviation uses Kemble Airport at Kemble. The former airfield at Long Newnton (1 mi southeast of Tetbury) was originally the home of the Cotswold Gliding Club, which has since moved 6 mi to the north to Aston Down.

Tetbury is on the A433, with easy access to the M4 and M5 motorways. The A4135 originates in Tetbury and proceeds westerly through Beverston.

Notable people

Present
Jet Black, drummer and founder member of rock band The Stranglers
King Charles III, has a private residence of Highgrove House at Highgrove, Doughton, near Tetbury
Anne Hooper, journalist, author and counsellor
Jake Meyer, the youngest British person to climb Mount Everest
Josh Kumra, singer/songwriter
Neil Woodford, investment fund manager
David Mabberley, Professor of botany, writer, and educator
Gaynor Norris, Regional salsa championships winner, North West England, 1994

Past
Charlotte Eliza Collins, the noted diarist, married Edward Tenney Bousfield at Tetbury in 1853.
Cecil "Sam" Cook, Gloucestershire cricketer and umpire, died 1996
Robert Crowley, stationer, poet and Protestant clergyman in the 16th century
Alice Liddell Hargreaves, inspiration behind Alice in Wonderland
Ester Lewis, poet (1716–1794), married Robert Clark of Tetbury in 1760 and is buried there.
Laurens van der Post, a writer, owned a nearby farm in the 1930s, died 1996
Brian Trubshaw, first British test-pilot of Concorde, died 2001

See also
St Saviour's Church, Tetbury

References

External links 

Tetbury Online
 Town Council
Tetbury Town Football Club
Tetbury Music Festival
Tetbury Town Guide
St Mary's Primary School
Sir William Romney's School

 
Towns in Gloucestershire
Civil parishes in Gloucestershire
Cotswold District
Cotswolds